Cartoon Orbit was a children's online gaming network created by Turner Online to promote its shows and partners. Created as an addition to the Cartoon Network website, Cartoon Orbit opened to the public in October 2000. Its main attraction was a system of virtual trading cards called "cToons", which generally featured animation cells from programs broadcast on the network, though advertisement-based cToons were also common. Added in October 2002 was the popular head-to-head strategy game gToons.

The site began to suffer from lack of maintenance beginning in 2005. On October 16, 2006, Cartoon Network shut down Cartoon Orbit and left users with a "Thank You" certificate as a token of their appreciation.

History

Early years
Cartoon Orbit was the brainchild of Sam Register, who was also behind the development of CartoonNetwork.com in 1998. He went on to become the creative director of the site as well as Cartoon Orbit from 2000 to 2001 before leaving to pursue television development with Cartoon Network in its Los Angeles studios. He came up with the idea for Cartoon Orbit after seeing Sesame Workshop's Sticker World. After Register left Cartoon Orbit, Art Roche became the creative director of CartoonNetwork.com. Justin Williams was the project lead at Turner and Director of Community for Cartoon Orbit until 2003, when he began working on other Cartoon Network interactive projects. Lisa Furlong Jones, Sharon Karleskint Sharp and Robert Cass created content and wrote copy for Cartoon Orbit, while Noel Saabye and Brian Hilling provided the art and animation.

The site was first registered in May 2000 with the beta phase ending in September of that year. The original name was to be "Cartooniverse", but it was changed because the copyright of that name was held by someone else. Cartoon Orbit was first built using parts of Communities.com's "Passport" software (not to be confused with the current Communities.com, which is unrelated). This software was a 2D avatar-based chat server where members could decorate their own spaces and it was used extensively in Orbit for displaying and editing . Most of the chat functionality, however, did not become part of the finished product. To comply with the Children's Online Privacy Protection Act, Cartoon Orbit instead had a list of pre-written words and phrases that players could send in a chat box. Until the complete conversion to Flash in 2002, references could still be found in the HTML source code to passport "room servers", and links to technical documentation on Communities.com's website. Also before the Flash transition were "Worlds" on Cartoon Orbit based on fictional cartoon locations, which came complete with a quote or quip from that world's characters, a poll, and links to "Spotlight" .

Viant worked on the site as well, offering project and business management for the development and beta and back-end software development for the user and content management. Scott Gutterman served as the lead at Viant, and Stacie Spychalski, David Gynn, Chris Griswold, Chip Plesnarski, Wan Agus, and others managed plans, requirements and developed the code. Before being acquired and ultimately closing, Viant went on to work at several Turner Broadcasting/Time-Warner projects from 2000 to 2002.

Cartoon Orbit was launched in October 2000 as an online community with required registration. Its membership grew over 150,000 members strong by mid-December, and that figure increased to over 300,000 by February 2001. Members exceeded 850,000 by October 2001. Shortly after its release, Register expressed a desire to convert Orbit's point-based currency to a cash-based setup, but this never came to fruition. As part of a larger campaign with Cartoon Network, a promotion for the fund-raising program Trick-or-Treat for UNICEF, which entailed exclusive Halloween-themed , was held from October 1 to November 5, 2002.

Closure

For the first few years, the site was updated weekly. Beginning in mid-2005, it became apparent that Turner Online stopped maintaining Cartoon Orbit. Updates were ceased in February 2006 and many reported bugs went unfixed. On August 17, 2006, Cartoon Network removed the navigation for Cartoon Orbit from its main header, causing many users to speculate that Cartoon Network had given up completely on Cartoon Orbit while some anticipated its closure. The same users also pointed to the recent AP press release from Cartoon Network about developing a then-unnamed cartoon-based MMORPG as proof that Cartoon Orbit would soon be a thing of the past. Starting on September 29, 2006, users were no longer able to sign up for and create new Cartoon Orbit accounts. When clicking on the "Join Now" button, the user was instead presented with a "Registration is Closed" page.

Cartoon Orbit officially closed on the early morning of its closing date, October 16, 2006. The link that was placed at the bottom of the home page was redirected to Cartoon Network ¡Ya!, Cartoon Network's Spanish site; however, directly linking to their web address showed that Cartoon Orbit was still online. The following day, the login was removed from the homepage and anyone who tried logging in on another site page was disallowed. Today, all links to Cartoon Orbit now redirect to the CartoonNetwork.com homepage.

Features

 came with a wide range of functionalities. Most were static, but some were animated and/or had sound. Other , when clicked, played mini-games or had special functionality (such as a Dexter's Laboratory-themed  that automatically counted down to Albert Einstein's birthday).

Players were given their own gallery spaces, called , to decorate with cards of their choice. One could further customize their  by changing their 's background.

Items
Three main collectibles were available in the Cartoon Orbit game: .
 : The main collectible item of Cartoon Orbit.  was short for Cartoon, just as eMail is short for Electronic Mail. They could be thought of as trading cards or more accurately e-stickers (as they could be displayed on a ).  could be plain, be animated, play sounds, or both. Some  were part of special sets, and developed their own names.  These included:
 Golden :  that were gold in color; some of which were very rare.
 Ad : Sponsored advertisement . Typically gained via a code, and some of which would disappear after the promotion ended, be changed to remove the advertisement logo, or replaced with a different  altogether.
 Code :  that were only available by entering a code, and after a designated amount of time, were expired. They could be found on Cartoon Network commercials, on promotional items, or at sponsor sites. Codes were also revealed during Cartoon Cartoon Fridays and on Kids' WB.
Some of them would give you a 'prize' code  at the end if you achieved a certain target.
New checklist  were created from November 2001 to June 2003.
 Sticker : Much like a traditional sticker, most had quotes or quips from the character portrayed. The majority of the sticker  were released in 2001.
 Holiday : First released at Christmas time in 2001, these quickly became some of the most popular  in Orbit. In 2002 and 2003, inexpensive Holiday presents were created which were meant to be freely given to other players. After Christmas, the present  were automatically exchanged for a real .
 Auction Only :  that could only be purchased from Orbit Auctions.
 : Much like a webring,  joined players together with a common theme. In the early years of Orbit, clicking on a  took you to another player's  that was displaying that .
 Blue Back : Very rare  that got their name from the blue background they were created on.

gToons

 was Cartoon Orbit's own digital collectible card game extension. Launched on October 14, 2002, over 250,000 users had joined after the first month and over 400,000 users were playing after the first two months.  was discontinued alongside Cartoon Orbit on October 16, 2006, although it has been stated that it might return "as a stand-alone game sometime in the future with new sets of game pieces to collect".

In December 2007,  was revived as "Action Packs" for Transformers: Animated, followed by a Ben 10: Alien Force version becoming available in April 2008. Though the revival is now only available in a single-player mode, the rules and design are virtually identical to the original.

Gameplay
Players assembled decks composed of 12 cards each. Two colors (determined by the "bottom" card of each player's deck) were goal colors: if the two colors were both "neutral" colors (black or silver), the higher total point value won. If there was exactly one non-neutral color (blue, red, yellow, green, purple, etc.) between the goal colors, a player with more cards of the non-neutral color would receive a 15-point bonus to their total before determining victory. If neither color were neutral, a player could win by having more of each color in play than the opponent; otherwise, the higher total value won. Five separate expansion packs containing different  were released between 2003 and 2006.

Areas
 : An area where players could buy cards. Cards could be sorted by show, by character, by price, by type, by prop or by set.
 : The part of the Cartoon Orbit site that belonged to the user. They could decorate their  with any of Orbit's cards like a gallery or sticker book.
 : Where a user could find other people's . They would type in their user name, find the name, or find it by letter.
 : An area where users could view new  and updates on Orbit, and also the main Live Trading area.
 My Collection: An area where Orbiters could view their cards. Cards were able to be sorted into categories by show or by type. Users could also hide their cards from trading or even delete them.
 Auctions: A standard auction setup which allowed players to put  up for sale. Auctions were introduced in August 2002.
 My Favorites: A section where one could visit someone's  and add them to a Buddy List. The Buddy List also allowed a user to see if the person they added was logged in. If they were logged in, they could choose to "follow" the person and go to the section of the website that they were currently located at. The  somewhat resembled this.
 Team Orbit: A group of 100 Cartoon Orbit users who were chosen to make suggestions about the game after it was released to the public. Team Orbit only lasted a few months in 2001, and it was replaced by the ideas and comments coming from numerous fan sites.
 ToonFlash Newsletter: A newsletter that Cartoon Orbit periodically sent out to all users via email.

References

External links
 Massive Cartoon Orbit Archival Project, a collaboration of information surrounding Cartoon Orbit

Browser-based game websites
Cartoon Network
Digital collectible card games
Online games
Internet properties established in 2000
Internet properties disestablished in 2006
2000 establishments in the United States
2006 disestablishments in the United States
Products and services discontinued in 2006